Marseille Borely Racecourse (Hippodrome de Marseille Borely) is a horse racing facility for thoroughbred flat racing and standardbred harness racing located at 16, avenue de Bonneveine in Marseille, France.

The race track was established in 1860. Its current grandstand and other amenities were built in 1999.

References
 Hippodrome de Marseille Borély official website 

Marseille
Marseille
1860 establishments in France
Buildings and structures in Marseille
Sport in Marseille
Tourist attractions in Marseille
Sports venues completed in 1860